Lakeview is a hamlet and census-designated place (CDP) in the Town of Hempstead in Nassau County, on Long Island, in New York, United States. The population was 6,077 at the 2020 census.

History 
Lakeview's name reflects upon its proximity to Hempstead Lake at Hempstead Lake State Park.

Geography

Demographics

2020 census

2000 Census
At the 2000 census there were 5,607 people, 1,525 households, and 1,287 families in the CDP. The population density was 5,850.2 per square mile (2,255.1/km). There were 1,569 housing units at an average density of 1,637.1/sq mi (631.0/km).  The racial makeup of the CDP was 6.90% White, 84.95% African American, 0.32% Native American, 0.48% Asian, 3.44% from other races, and 3.91% from two or more races. Hispanic or Latino of any race were 6.94%.

Of the 1,525 households 37.8% had children under the age of 18 living with them, 51.6% were married couples living together, 26.5% had a female householder with no husband present, and 15.6% were non-families. 11.3% of households were one person and 5.5% were one person aged 65 or older. The average household size was 3.59 and the average family size was 3.81.

The age distribution was 28.3% under the age of 18, 8.1% from 18 to 24, 27.5% from 25 to 44, 22.6% from 45 to 64, and 13.5% 65 or older. The median age was 36 years. For every 100 females, there were 82.6 males. For every 100 females age 18 and over, there were 75.6 males.

The median household income was $98,036. The per capita income for the CDP was $28,575. About 4.9% of families and 6.3% of the population were below the poverty line, including 6.4% of those under age 18 and 7.7% of those age 65 or over.

References

Hempstead, New York
Census-designated places in New York (state)
Census-designated places in Nassau County, New York